Croatan High School is  a public secondary school in Newport, North Carolina. The high school is part of the Carteret County Public Schools system. It serves the westernmost third of Carteret County, including the towns of Peletier, Cape Carteret, Cedar Point and western half of the island of Bogue Banks, which includes the town of Emerald Isle.

Awards and recognition
In 2009 and 2010, U.S. News & World Report ranked Croatan among the top high schools in the United States, awarding the school silver medals. Croatan High School's class of 2010 marked combined SAT scores (based on math and critical reading) of 1076, up from 1064 the previous year, this was 59 points higher than the national average.

Athletics
All athletic teams compete in the 3A division level. Croatan holds several state titles including men’s soccer, wrestling, women's golf, and men's indoor track.
Football
Men's and Women's Soccer
Men's and Women's Golf 
Men's and Women's Basketball
Men's and Women's Swim 
Men’s and Women’s Lacrosse 
Wrestling 
Cheerleading 
Track and Field 
Cross Country

See also
List of high schools in North Carolina

References

External links
 

Educational institutions established in 1999
Public high schools in North Carolina
Schools in Carteret County, North Carolina
1999 establishments in North Carolina